Bonnetia kathleenae is a species of flowering plant in the Bonnetiaceae family. It is found only in Venezuela.

References

Endemic flora of Venezuela
Vulnerable plants
kathleenae
Taxonomy articles created by Polbot
Taxobox binomials not recognized by IUCN